Malek Shakuhi (born 5 April 1960) is a Syrian football goalkeeper who played for Syria at the 1984 Asian Cup and 1988 Asian Cup finals.

References

External links

1960 births
Living people
Syrian footballers
Syria international footballers
1980 AFC Asian Cup players
1984 AFC Asian Cup players
1988 AFC Asian Cup players
Hutteen Latakia players
Al-Jaish Damascus players
Tishreen SC players
Association football goalkeepers
Syrian Premier League players